Lulu is a 1996 Canadian drama film directed by Srinivas Krishna. It was screened in the Un Certain Regard section at the 1996 Cannes Film Festival.

The film stars Kim Lieu as Khuyen, a Vietnamese woman who comes to Canada as a mail-order bride, marrying Lucky (Michael Rhoades) with the intention of gaining Canadian citizenship so that she can sponsor her parents to come to Canada and escape Vietnam's oppressive government, only to get mixed up in organized crime when she meets Clive (Clark Johnson), a hustler on the run from local crime boss Kingsley (Saeed Jaffrey).

The film was Lieu's first ever acting role; Krishna cast her in the film after discovering her working at a corner store in Kensington Market.

Following its premiere at Cannes, the film was subsequently screened at the 1996 Montreal World Film Festival, and at the 1996 Toronto International Film Festival.

Cast
 Kim Lieu - Khuyen
 Clark Johnson - Clive
 Michael Rhoades - Lucky
 Manuel Aranguiz
 Peter Breck
 Saeed Jaffrey - Kingsley
 Nghi Do
 Phuong Dan Nguten
 Richard Chevolleau
 Kay Tremblay
 Jack Jessop
 Dick Callahan
 Paul Persofsky
 Christofer Williamson
 Tony Meyler

References

External links

1996 films
1996 drama films
Canadian drama films
Films about Vietnamese Canadians
English-language Canadian films
1990s English-language films
1990s Canadian films